Göltarla is a village in the Samsat District of Adıyaman Province in Turkey. The village is populated by Kurds of the Bezikan tribe and had a population of 175 in 2021.

The hamlets of Keçiören and Sarıkök are attached to the village.

References

Villages in Samsat District
Kurdish settlements in Adıyaman Province